Al-Remas Music Productions Ltd. is a company specialized in the production and distribution of music with a focus on promoting artists from Iraq and the Persian Gulf. Founded by Rafat Albadr in 2013, the channel specializes in Arabic-language music.

See also

Television in Iraq

References

External links
 Music Al Remas TV Official website

Television stations in Iraq
Arab mass media
Arabic-language television stations
Television channels and stations established in 2013
Arab Spring and the media